Carlson Wade (7 June 1928 – 1993) was an American alternative health writer who authored many books promoting detoxification, fasting, juicing, megavitamin therapy, natural foods and raw food dieting. He developed a fad diet known as the Enzyme-Catalyst Diet.

Biography

Wade was born on 7 June 1928 in New York City. He was the son of Arthur Wade and Lena Franks. He worked as a literary agent in New York from 1949 and was a member of the American Medical Writers Association.

Wade first became known for his books on sexual topics such as fetishism, homosexuality, sadomasochism and transvestism. His The Trouble Sex, published in 1961 offered behavioral clues how the American public could "detect" a lesbian. His work was classified as "pulp sexology", for example his book Sexual Deviations of the American Female (1965) gave anthropological generalisations about lesbian subcultures.

Wade's books on dieting and health were criticized by medical experts as quackery. His The New Enzyme-Catalyst Diet (1976), recommended with each meal to add raw fruit and vegetables such as bananas, celery, nuts and wheat germ.

The diet forbid the consumption of fried, processed or sugar foods. Wade argued that raw fruits and vegetables "are prime sources of enzymes which then are used by your billions of body cells to alert the mitochondria to perform internal combustion; this action helps to melt the accumulated fat in your cells, and wash them right out of your body." This idea is not supported by scientific evidence.

Dieticians noted that the statement is false because enzymes in foods are digested to amino acids and once absorbed play no enzymatic role.

Nutritionist Judith S. Stern commented that Wade's The New Enzyme-Catalyst Diet is filled with scientific misstatements such as "the most vital digestive enzyme is hydrochloric acid" and concluded that it is a "classroom example of a fad diet."

Wade's book Health Food Recipes for Gourmet Cooking, was criticized by Choice Reviews as "unintelligible jargon at best".

Selected publications

References

External links
Carlson Wade at Internet Archive

1928 births
1993 deaths
20th-century American non-fiction writers
Alternative detoxification promoters
Alternative medicine activists
American cookbook writers
American health and wellness writers
Fasting advocates
Orthomolecular medicine advocates
Pseudoscientific diet advocates
Raw foodists